Ian Robertson Underwood (born May 22, 1939) is a woodwind and keyboards player, known for his work with Frank Zappa and the Mothers of Invention.

Biography
Underwood graduated from The Choate School in 1957 and Yale University with a bachelor's degree in composition in 1961 and a master's degree in composition at UC Berkeley in 1966.  He began his career by playing San Francisco Bay Area coffeehouses and bars with his improvisational group, the Jazz Mice, in the mid-1960s before he became a member of Frank Zappa and the Mothers of Invention in 1967 for their third studio album, We're Only in It for the Money. He speaks on Uncle Meat; on the track "Ian Underwood Whips It Out" he relates how he first met Zappa and demonstrated his capabilities on the saxophone at Zappa's invitation. Underwood later worked with Frank Zappa on his solo recordings, including 1969's Hot Rats. He married Ruth Komanoff (Underwood), marimbist/percussionist from the Mothers of Invention in May 1969. Underwood left the Mothers of Invention in September 1973. He and Ruth divorced in 1986.

After his association with Frank Zappa, he pursued a career as a session keyboardist. Underwood has since been proficient on the Minimoog synthesizer, mostly in film. He has been credited in recordings for Quincy Jones, Barbra Streisand, Ronee Blakley, Hugh Cornwell, Freddie Hubbard, Jean-Luc Ponty, Herb Alpert, Hugh Masekela, Peggy Lee, Dolly Parton, Chicago, Janet Jackson, Dave Grusin, Jefferson Airplane, Frankie Valli, the Carpenters, James Ingram, and Barry Manilow. Underwood was also one of the musicians who played the main title theme for the 1980s hit series Knight Rider. Underwood was the uncredited producer of the debut album by Alice Cooper, Pretties For You, in 1969.

Underwood contributed synthesizers and programming to the historic recording of the Michael Jackson/Lionel Richie single "We Are the World" (produced by Quincy Jones in 1985); he has also been a featured performer (mostly on keyboard) with James Horner on numerous James Horner film scores including Titanic (1997) and Sneakers (1992).

Discography
Lenox School of Jazz Concert, 1959 w/ Ornette Coleman, Herb Pomeroy

With Frank Zappa/The Mothers of Invention
We're Only in It for the Money (1968)
Cruising with Ruben & the Jets (1968)
Uncle Meat (1969)
Hot Rats (1969)
Burnt Weeny Sandwich (1970)
Weasels Ripped My Flesh (1970)
Chunga's Revenge (1970)
Fillmore East - June 1971 (1971)
200 Motels (1971)
Just Another Band from L.A. (1971)
Over-Nite Sensation (1973)
Apostrophe (1974)
Zoot Allures (1976)
Orchestral Favorites (1979)
With Sandy Hurvitz
Sandy's Album Is Here At Least (Bizarre, 1968)
With Captain Beefheart
Trout Mask Replica (Straight, 1969) 
With Alice Cooper
Pretties for You (Straight, 1969)
With Jean-Luc Ponty
King Kong: Jean-Luc Ponty Plays the Music of Frank Zappa (World Pacific/Liberty, 1970)
With Freddie Hubbard
High Energy (Columbia, 1974)
Liquid Love (Columbia, 1975)
With Quincy Jones
 Mellow Madness (A&M, 1975)
 Roots (A&M, 1977)
 The Dude (A&M, 1981)
 Back on the Block (Qwest/Warner Bros, 1989) 
With Gábor Szabó
Macho (Salvation, 1975)
With Alphonse Mouzon
The Man Incognito (Blue Note, 1975)
With Porter Wagoner and Dolly Parton
Say Forever You'll Be Mine (RCA Victor, 1975)
With Flo & Eddie
Illegal, Immoral and Fattening (Columbia, 1975)
Moving Targets (Columbia, 1976)
With Spirit
Farther Along (Mercury, 1976)
With Carmen McRae
Can't Hide Love (Blue Note, 1976)
With Seawind
Seawind (CTI, 1976)
With Alphonso Johnson
Moonshadows (1976)
 With Chunky, Novi & Ernie 
Chunky, Novi, & Ernie (Warner Bros, 1977)
With Ambrosia
Somewhere I've Never Travelled (20th Century Fox, 1978)
With Lalo Schifrin
Gypsies (Tabu, 1978)
No One Home (Tabu, 1979)
With Herb Alpert
Herb Alpert / Hugh Masekela (Horizon, 1978)
With Barbra Streisand
Songbird (Columbia, 1978)
With Peggy Lee
 Close Enough for Love (1979)
With Chicago
Chicago XIV (Columbia, 1980)
With Janet Jackson
Janet Jackson (A&M, 1982)
Jefferson Airplane
Jefferson Airplane Loves You (1992)
Some of his work on Film Scores
2010 The Karate Kid (synthesizer programmer) 
2009 Avatar (synthesizer programmer) 
2008 The Boy in the Striped Pyjamas (synthesizer programmer) 
2008 The Spiderwick Chronicles (music score programmer) 
2007 The Life Before Her Eyes (music score programmer) 
2006 Apocalypto (musician: synthesizer programming) 
2006 All the King's Men (synthesizer programmer) 
2005 The New World (synthesizer programmer) 
2004 Bobby Jones: Stroke of Genius (synthesizer programmer) 
2001 I Iris (synthesizer programmer) 
1998 Mighty Joe Young (musician) 
1997 Titanic (musician: instrumental solo) 
1995 Braveheart (instrumental soloist: synth programming, London Symphony Orchestra) 
1993 Bopha! (musician) 
1993 House of Cards (featured musician) 
1993 Jack the Bear (musician) 
1992 Sneakers (musician) 
1991 Class Action (musician) 
1991 My Heroes Have Always Been Cowboys (musician: instrumental solo) 
1989 Field of Dreams (musician: instrumental solo) 
1989 Honey, I Shrunk the Kids (synthesizer programming and performance) 
1989 Winter People (musician: keyboards) 
1988 Red Heat (musician)
1988 Willow (musician: Fairlight synthesizer) 
1987 No Way Out (musician – as Ian R. Underwood) 
1986 The Mosquito Coast (musician: synthesizers) 
1986 The Name of the Rose (synthesizer programmer) 
1986 Aliens (synthesizer effects) 
1983 Krull (synthesizer effects)  
1983 Brainstorm (synthesizer effects)  
1982 Blade Runner (musician: synthesizer) 
1979 The Warriors (musician: synthesizer)
1977 Demon Seed (electronic performances)
1976 Marathon Man (musician: keyboards – uncredited) 
1971 200 Motels (music performer: Mothers of Invention)

References

External links
Complete discography

The Mothers of Invention members
American multi-instrumentalists
1939 births
Living people
Choate Rosemary Hall alumni